Call of Duty: Mobile is a free-to-play shooter game developed by TiMi Studio Group and published by Activision for Android and iOS. It was released on October 1, 2019, where it was one of the largest mobile game launches in history, generating over 480 million with 270 million downloads within a year. Call of Duty: Mobile was published in other regions by Garena, Tencent Games, VNG Games and TiMi Studio Group.

Gameplay 
Players can choose to play ranked or non-ranked matches in multiplayer mode. It has two types of in-game currencies: "Credits", which are earned through playing the game, and "COD Points", which are bought with real-world money. It is possible to play the full game without paying, though some exclusive character and weapon skins can only be bought with COD Points. Apart from standard matchmaking, a private room for both the multiplayer and battle royale modes can also be accessed where players can invite and battle with their in-game friends.

Multiplayer 
The multiplayer mode is a first-person shooter similar to previous Call of Duty games. The game also has "Scorestreaks", which are special weapons that are available as the player reaches certain times and points. The primary modes which the game features include are Team Deathmatch, Frontline, Domination, Hardpoint, Search and Destroy and Kill Confirmed  Additionally, the game features special and limited multiplayer modes that last for varying lengths of time. These include: Prop Hunt, Rapid Fire, Sticks and Stones, 2v2, Capture the Flag, One Shot One Kill, Snipers Only, and Gun Game, and Attack of the Undead among others.

Battle Royale 
The game also includes battle royale modes featuring up to 100 players. A player can choose to play alone, on a two-man team, or in a four-man squad. At the start of a game, all players choose an ability from healing to making a launch pad. Once all 100 people are ready, they get aboard a plane that flies in a straight line over the map. This flight path changes every game. Every team is automatically given a jump leader who decides when and where the team will land. At the beginning of the game, each player carries only a knife. The map has weapons, vehicles, and items which players can find and use to improve their chances of killing enemies while staying alive themselves. The mode has high tier loot zones (marked in yellow on the map) that provide players with better items. The safe zone on the map shrinks as the game progresses, with players who remain outside the safe zone being killed if they stay outside for too long. A player or team wins the game if they are the last one remaining. Particularly, battle royale also has limited modes like Sniper Challenge, Battle Royale Alcatraz, Battle Royale Blackout, 20v20 Warfare, and Battle Royale Blitz.

Zombies 
A Zombies mode was added in November 2019. It featured one map called Shi No Numa. It placed teams of players against zombies that attacked in waves. It was playable in Endless Survival Mode, which ran like the classic Zombies experience, and Raid Mode, which threw a set number of waves at the players before transitioning to a boss encounter. The players could choose whether to play it on Normal or Heroic difficulty. The mode was removed in March 2020 due to it not reaching the desired level of quality. Undead Siege, a zombie survival mode, was added into the game in August 2021. In it, a team of four players have to survive and protect their teleportation device from continuous waves of zombies. During the day, players have to collect supplies which would be used during the night to survive against a horde of zombies. In addition, players during the day also take part in Daytime Side Missions, which include the Butcher, breaking the Aether Crystal Cluster, feeding 10 zombies to Cerberus and helping transport a big Aether Crystal. The mode has 3 difficulties - Casual, Hardcore and Nightmare. In casual, the team only has to survive for 3 nights while in other difficulties, the team has to survive for 5 nights. The Classic Zombies mode was added back to the game in October 2022, again only featuring the Shi No Numa map.

Development and release 
Call of Duty: Mobile was announced in March 2019, with TiMi-J3, itself a TiMi Studio Group division, which is a subsidiary of Tencent Games, leading development. Many of the game's features were revealed at this announcement, promising a familiar experience for fans of the console games. The aim of the game was to take familiar aspects from the franchise's previous games and allow users to access them from their mobile devices. It features two in-game currencies, as well as a battle pass. The initial release was in Australia on June 15, 2019, following the soft-launches in Australia, Canada and Peru. Garena released the game in Hong Kong, Indonesia, Macau, Malaysia, Philippines, Singapore, Taiwan & Thailand on September 29, 2019. The game was released in Europe, North America and Latin America by Activision on September 30, 2019, and by Tencent Games in South Korea on October 1, 2019. VNG Games released the game after the worldwide release in partnership with Activision and TiMi Studios in Vietnam on April 20, 2020. Tencent Games published the game for Mainland China on December 24, 2020.

Call of Duty: Mobile features many playable characters, maps, and game modes from previous games in the series. Different control settings were included to cater to player's preferences. A "zombies" game mode was added to the game in November 2019. This game mode followed the classic Call of Duty zombies "survival" formula where the player fights off endless waves of zombies, aiming to survive as long as possible. A "Raid" mode was also included where the player had to defeat a set amount of waves of zombies before encountering one of two final bosses. Call of Duty: Mobile Zombies mode was removed on March 25, 2020, due to the game mode not meeting Activision's standards.

On March 2023, as part of its acquisition of Activision-Blizzard, Microsoft announced in its documents submitted to the Competition and Markets Authority of the United Kingdom that the game would be "phased out over time (outside of China) with the launch of Warzone Mobile."

Esports 
The Call of Duty: Mobile World Championship 2020 Tournament was a partnership between Activision Blizzard and Sony Mobile Communications, and marks the game's entry into the top tier of esports. It featured more than $1 million in total prizes, which include both cash and in-game cosmetics. Competing teams were drawn directly from the game's community through four open online qualifiers from April 20 to May 24, 2020. Eligible players ranked veteran or higher have the chance to play. The 2021 tournament featured a $2 million prize pool.

Reception 

Call of Duty: Mobile received "generally favorable reviews", according to the review aggregator Metacritic. IGN wrote that the game “represents the best the juggernaut franchise has ever been on a handheld platform. The leveling path is rewarding, even without spending money, and there are lots of modes to jump around between, including an impressive battle royale mode.” GameSpot says “beyond its messy micro-transaction menus and the slight time-saving purchases, there's not much else in Call of Duty Mobile that detracts from its faithful recreation of the exhilarating and fast-paced multiplayer action of the core series.” Polygon also praised the game stating, “Call of Duty: Mobile doesn’t come across like a deeply compromised or watered-down rendition of the age-old multiplayer format; it just feels like Call of Duty.”

In the first month, the game had over 148 million downloads and generated nearly 54 million in revenue, making it the largest mobile game launch in history. By June 2020, the game had seen over 250 million downloads, generating over $327 million in revenue. By October 2020, that figure had risen to over $480 million with 270 million downloads. As of February 2022, the game has generated over $1.5 billion globally in revenue from in-game spending and microtransactions, with the game having seen over 500 million downloads since May 2021.

Awards

References

External links 
 

2019 video games
Activision games
Android (operating system) games
Battle royale games
Mobile games
Mobile
First-person shooter multiplayer online games
Free-to-play video games
IOS games
Multiplayer online games
Tencent
Video games containing battle passes
Video games developed in China
Video games set in Cuba
Video games set in Iraq
Video games set in Kyrgyzstan
Video games set in Nevada
Video games set in Los Angeles
Video games set in Saudi Arabia
Video games set in the Netherlands
Video games set in the United Kingdom
Video games set in Russia
Video games set in Afghanistan
Video games set in Pakistan
Video games set in Tunisia
Video games set in France
Video games set in New York City
Video games set in Panama
Video games set in Greece
Video games set in Ukraine
Video games set in China
Video games set in Spain
Video games set in the Arctic
Video games set in the Middle East
Video games set in Miami
Video games set in Angola
Video games set in Laos
Video games set in Brazil
Video games set in Uzbekistan
Video games set in New Mexico
The Game Awards winners
BAFTA winners (video games)
Garena games